The 1983 Libertarian National Convention was held from August 29 to September 4, 1983, at the Sheraton Hotel in New York, New York. The delegates at the convention, on behalf of the  U.S. Libertarian Party, nominated David Bergland for the president and James A. Lewis for the vice president in the 1984 presidential election.

Paul Grant was elected as chairman of the Libertarian Party National Committee, winning out over Sheldon Richman. Grant served as chairman from 1983 to 1985.

Libertarians hold a National Convention every two years to vote on party bylaws, platform and resolutions and elect national party officers and a judicial committee. Every four years it nominates presidential and vice presidential candidates.

Voting for presidential nomination

First ballot

Second ballot

After the second round, Mary Ruwart dropped out, throwing her support for David Bergland.

Third ballot

Fourth Ballot

Voting for vice presidential nomination
A separate vote was held for the vice presidential nomination.

First ballot
After the first ballot, David Nolan (finishing third) dropped out, throwing his support for James A. Lewis

Second ballot
Upon Completion of the second ballot, Fuhrig withdrew, allowing Jim Lewis to secure the nomination on the third and final ballot.

See also
 1984 Democratic National Convention
 1984 Republican National Convention
 1984 United States presidential election
 U.S. presidential nomination convention

References

Libertarian Party (United States) National Conventions
1984 United States presidential election
Libertarian National Convention
Political conventions in New York City
1983 conferences
Libertarian National Convention
Libertarian National Convention